Akanthosuchus (meaning "spine crocodile," in reference to its armor) is an extinct genus of alligatoroid crocodilian, possibly an alligatorine.  Its fossils are found in the Paleocene-age  Nacimiento Formation of the San Juan Basin, New Mexico, USA. It is known from a partial skeleton and isolated bony armor.  Its armor was distinctive, with spike-shaped and blade-shaped pieces, and it is the only known crocodilian with a combination of both.

History and description
Akanthosuchus is based on NMMNH NP-139, a partial skeleton lacking the skull.  The specimen was found in a concretionary sandstone lens with the anterior portion eroding out.  It was discovered in Torrejon Wash, northwestern Sandoval County, New Mexico.  The hind legs, numerous back, hip, and tail vertebrae (28), and armor (about 200 scutes) were the primary elements preserved. F. Michael O'Neill et al. described the genus in 1981.  The type species is A. langstoni, honoring paleontologist Wann Langston Jr., known for his work on fossil crocodilians.

Akanthosuchus was a moderately sized crocodilian. However, this specimen may not have been fully grown. Based on growth rings, Hill and Lucas suggest that it was no younger than eight years old when it died. The tail may have been relatively short, given the reduction of bony projections on known tail vertebrae. The armor was unusual in having elongate spikes or broad blades. Its scutes came in four basic types: square (13%, keeled or unkeeled), oval (27%, keeled), bladed (<1%, similar to oval but with a much exaggerated triangular keel), and spiked (60%, square-based, conical and blunt). They contacted only one other scute each, and may have been arranged in paired sets down the midline of the back and tail, and along the sides of the animal. Single rows of paired oval scutes may have filled in between the spiked rows. The bladed scutes, an extreme of the oval scute form, may have been found at the ends of the oval scute rows. The square scutes may have been restricted to one area, such as the neck and shoulders, or they may represent the belly armor.

Spiked and bladed scutes are not unknown among crocodilians, although no other known crocodilian had or has both. O'Neill and colleagues compared Akanthosuchus to Pinacosuchus, a crocodylomorph with spiked scutes known from the Late Cretaceous North Horn Formation of Utah, but it differed from Akanthosuchus in several ways: it was much smaller (three to four times smaller than NMMNH NP-139), it had less derived vertebrae, and it lacked bladed scutes.

Classification
O'Neill et al. suggested that Akanthosuchus was an alligatorine, based on the characteristics of a partial lower jaw bone (retroarticular). They considered the possibility that Akanthosuchus is a postcranial skeleton of either Ceratosuchus or Navajosuchus, contemporaneous crocodilians known primarily from skulls, but elected to name a new genus instead. More recently, Hill and Lucas, using a cladistic analysis, rejected the hypothesis that Akanthosuchus is the same as either Ceratosuchus or Navajosuchus, and found that Akanthosuchus is an alligatoroid.  It tended to sort out with alligatorines, but Hill and Lucas found that this was weakly supported in their analysis.

Distribution
NMMNH NP-139 came from the upper part of the Torrejonian portion of the Nacimiento Formation. Later work identified Akanthosuchus langstoni from the older Puercan-age portion of the Nacimiento Formation as well, which gives the genus a range including much of the Nacimiento Formation, deposited between approximately 64.5 and 61.0 million years ago. A scute and femur from the De-Na-Zin Member of the late Campanian-age (Late Cretaceous) Kirtland Formation are similar to the corresponding elements of Akanthosuchus, but cannot be conclusively assigned to the genus at this time.  This material is also from the San Juan Basin.

Paleobiology
The Nacimiento Formation is interpreted as having had a fluvial and lacustrine depositional setting. O'Neill et al. interpreted Akanthosuchus as either a terrestrial crocodilian or a specialized, modestly sized, heavily armored aquatic crocodilian.

References

Alligatoridae
Paleocene crocodylomorphs
Paleocene reptiles of North America
Fossil taxa described in 1981
Taxa named by Spencer G. Lucas
Prehistoric pseudosuchian genera